The presidential primaries of the Nueva Mayoría in 2013 was the method of election of the Chilean presidential candidate of the political parties Christian Democrat, Radical Social-Democrat, For Democracy, Socialist (who formed the Concertation of Parties for Democracy), Movimiento Amplio Social, Communist and Citizen Left and, in addition to the left-wing and center-left independents, grouped in the "Nueva Mayoría" pact, for the 2013 election. On that same date, the conglomerate also planned to hold its parliamentary primaries in districts and/or districts where appropriate; However, on 1 May it was decided that such primaries would not be carried out at the official level.

It was the first primary of the Concertación under the primary law, approved during 2012, which regulates its exercise. In addition, it had as a novelty the participation of more than two candidates, unlike the previous primary elections of the coalition, in it they faced - according to the order in which they appeared in the ballot - Michelle Bachelet, José Antonio Gómez Urrutia, Claudio Orrego  and Andres Velasco.

Michelle Bachelet, who was president of the Republic between 2006 and 2010, obtained the nomination after winning more than 73% of the votes with the official support of the Socialist Party, the Party for Democracy, the Broad Social Movement, the Citizen Left and the Communist Party of Chile. In second place, the independent Andres Velasco was with about 13% of the votes. Further down was the Christian Democrat Claudio Orrego with 9% and the radical José Antonio Gómez Urrutia with 5%.

Background 

After the last primaries, and the defeat of Eduardo Frei before Sebastián Piñera that gave way to the first government of center right since the return to the democracy, voices arose to reform Concertación and to think in a process of primaries more ample for the elections of 2013. On the other hand, the high popularity that Michelle Bachelet had when leaving the government placed her as the first option to face the following presidential elections; Despite her arrival in New York to run UN Women, Bachelet led all polls, outnumbering her nearest rival for the primaries by more than 40 points and defeating potential right-wing candidates in a runoff in all stages. This advantage of Bachelet, who held in suspense her aspirations as a candidate, raised the possibility of a direct nomination by the parties of the Concertación without going to primaries.

Primaries of the Christian Democrat Party

Within the Christian Democratic Party of Chile (PDC), there was debate regarding the possibility of raising one's own candidacy or to fold to the potential candidacy of Michelle Bachelet if she decided to return to the country. Finally, the party opted for the first option and two militants demonstrated their interest in being the candidate of the community: Senator Ximena Rincón, who publicly stated this intention in December 2011, which officialized on November 16, 2012; And the then mayor of Peñalolén, Claudio Orrego who decided to run for the presidency of Chile in March 2012.

Faced with such a scenario, the PDC defined in November 2012 to carry out an internal primary to define its pre-candidate to the Concertación primary, which was held on January 19, 2013. This election was opened, so that both militants were able to vote for the PDC as citizens who were not registered in another political party.

56, 263 people participated in the election, and the results were as follows:

Expansion of the coalition

In the months leading up to the 2012 municipal elections, the possibilities of reforming the Concertación and expanding it, include other parties and movements of the left and center-left. In September 2011, the idea of generating an "Opposing Convergence" that replaced the Concertación was born; However, this proposal would not materialize. Many concertationist leaders raised the exhaustion or death of the Concertación as such.

Although already since the municipal elections of 2008, the Concertación had participated alongside the Communist Party and other movements in an instrumental pact to promote the election of candidates of both blocks (and that allowed in the 2010 parliamentarians the PC to obtain its first deputies under the Binomial system), the possibility of officially integrating them into a broader pact began to materialize during 2012. The PPD and the PRSD formalized the list For a fair Chile for the election of councilors with the PC, which annoyed the PS leadership and The PDC, who even indicated the "end of the Concertación." Nevertheless, the parties of the Concertación and the Communist Party maintained their pact for the election of mayors, adding other movements and carrying out a process of primaries in 143 Communes in order to determine the unique candidate of the pact. The important victory that obtained the opposition to the government of Piñera in the Municipalities, achieving some emblematic victories like the one of the independent Josefa Errázuriz in Providencia, enhanced the possibility of a great pact between the parties and movements of center and left.

The Radical Social Democratic Party had already announced in mid 2012 the election as a candidate for the presidency of José Antonio Gómez Urrutia, president of the group. The independent Andres Velasco, who had mentioned his possible candidacy in the event that Michelle Bachelet did not come, made his precandidature on 16 of November 2012 in the context of the Concertación primaries, beyond what Bachelet did. Although talks were held with Marco Enríquez-Ominami (ex-MP, who won 20% of the vote in the elections Presidential elections of 2009 after they did not allow him to participate in the concertacionist primaries) to integrate the Progressive Party into the presidential and parliamentary primaries, he finally rejected the option and announced his direct candidacy for the first round of 2013.

In March 2013, Michelle Bachelet officially announced her resignation to UN Women in order to return to Chile; In her return speech, Bachelet mentioned his intention to participate in a "great primary" that "for a new majority, for a new policy, for a better country."  His candidacy was immediately supported by the Socialist Party and Party for Democracy, which was joined by other movements such as the Broad Social Movement in the following days.

In previous months, Congress had debated bills for the conduct of official primaries organized by the Electoral Service, unlike previous years where they were organized by the same parties. The law was finally approved, establishing June 30, 2013 as the first official primary in the country, both for presidential and parliamentary candidacies. On April 30, the presidents of the four parties of the Concertación, plus those of the Broad Social Movement, the Citizen Left and the Communist Party of Chile, registered the presidential primary candidates in the pact called "Nueva Mayoría": Michelle Bachelet, José Antonio Gómez Urrutia, Claudio Orrego and Andrés Velasco. This new pact, however, faced a severe crisis days later due to the impossibility of reaching an agreement to register primaries for the parliamentary elections before Servel. Although the four candidates expressed their rejection of this situation, it was Velasco who most strongly criticized the presidents of the parties, even studying the possibility of retiring from the primaries and running directly to the first round of the presidential elections. However, the new law prevented candidates enrolled in a primary can participate in the first round, before which Velasco agreed to continue in the primary election.

The Communist Party, in spite of signing the registration of the candidates of the Nueva Mayoría, had not defined the candidate that would support in the primaries. After a long internal discussion, where it was analyzed the support to Gómez or Bachelet, the party finally chose to supportfor the latter. The support of the PC to Bachelet generated diverse critics, particularly by the rejection that previously had manifested some figures of the Communist Youths (such as Camila Vallejo) to the figure of Bachelet; besides, the possibility that the PC integrated for the first time a government since 1973, alerted certain moderated sectors of the old Concertación.

Campaign 

The campaign of the primaries was marked by the invitation to participate in the primaries, in the context of the first ones made officially by the Servel and under the voluntary vote, which debuted in the municipal elections of the previous year.

Michelle Bachelet launched a campaign focused on citizenship, showing faces of people who mentioned their government program through videos and social networks, taking advantage of the charisma and proximity that are considered her main attributes. Along with the motto "I love Chile", Bachelet raised on several occasions that she had not sought her candidacy, but had responded to the call of citizenship. Her campaign was aimed at mentioning her proposals to draft a new constitution, a free higher education system and a tax reform to finance it, without going into the details that could rub her broad base of support. Also, her campaign called for support from those who participated in the various demonstrations against the government of Sebastián Piñera (especially the student mobilization of 2011) to turn their demands into reality.

José Antonio Gómez Urrutia, meanwhile, put an emphasis on his concrete proposals, aligned more to the left than the rest of the candidates, especially focusing on convening a constituent assembly or eliminating the system of AFPs, should they be elected. With a much better budget than other candidates, Gómez had to focus mainly on his campaign through social networks.

Andres Velasco's campaign started by strengthening his participation in them after he had originally raised his participation only if Bachelet did not appear. To this end, Velasco used the first motto VOY, reinforcing its distancing from the former. Moving forward in the campaign, Velasco concentrated on posing as a renewal against the bad practices of the "old politics"; the campaign adopted a more inclusive speech, with the new motto Allá vamos, and also more avant-garde in line with the liberal positions of Velasco. Thus, phrases like "Let's get out of the closet" or "Let's abort prejudice" were used by the independent campaign.

Claudio Orrego, known mainly for his role as mayor of Peñalolén, had to face the challenge of positioning himself as a statesman. For this, the campaign was oriented to show him as a serious and responsible candidate, using dark colors and highlighting a red O. He also pointed to the most centrist and conservative electorate on several occasions, with a few posters being debated with the phrase "I believe in God, so what? ", Paralleling the other pre-candidates with an agnostic or lay profile. Along with his campaign slogan "Chile Dares", Orrego also raised the issue of abuses and injustices as central in his campaign, especially through a viral video showing the indignation of citizenship.

In the weeks leading up to the primary, two live televised debates were held. The first was jointly organized by Canal 13 and CNN Chile, broadcast on June 10 and was moderated by journalists Daniel Matamala and Montserrat Álvarez. The second, was produced by Televisión Nacional de Chile, was held on June 23 and was moderated by Mauricio Bustamante. Although in the first debate the candidates devoted themselves to defend their ideas, the second debate marked a strong confrontation between some candidates, especially between Velasco and Orrego, who would have been targeting the most centrist segment of the electorate to reach second place (before an expected victory of Bachelet) that better position their future aspirations.

Results

Regional

References

2013 elections in Chile
Primary elections in Chile